Rok Štraus (born 3 March 1987) is a Slovenian professional footballer who plays as a defensive or central midfielder.

Career

Messina
Štraus began his senior career in Italy at ACR Messina. On January 1, 2006, he was loaned to second division Italian club Brescia for 6 months before rejoining Messina on June 30, 2006.

Salernitana 
On July 1, 2017, Štraus joined the second division Italian club, Salernitana.

NK Celje
On January 1, 2008, Štraus returned to Slovenia and signed a contract with first division club Celje.

Cracovia
In June 2011, he joined Polish first division club Cracovia on a three-year contract on a free transfer.

Ergotelis 
On July 17, 2014, Štraus joined Ergotelis, a Greek second division club on a free transfer.

Widzew Lodz 
On March 3, 2015, Rok Štraus went back to Poland to join second division club, Widzew Łódź on a free transfer.

Yokohama FC 
On August 24, 2015, he joined Japanese first division club, Yokohama FC on a free transfer.

Free Agent 
After leaving Yokohama FC on January 1, 2017, Rok Štraus was a free agent for 4 months.

Utenis
On 25 April 2017, Štraus joined Lithuanian A Lyga side Utenis, but he couldn't earn a lot of playing time and managed to appear only in four games before being released on 30 June 2017 as a free agent.

NK Celje 
On December 12, 2017, Rok Štraus went back to Slovenia and rejoined NK Celje where he is now. He has made 49 appearances for the club ever since for a total of 1,289 minutes. He has racked up 7 yellow cards but has yet to score a goal or an assist.

Stats

Honours
Celje
Slovenian PrvaLiga: 2019–20

References

External links
 
 NZS profile 
 
 

1987 births
Living people
Sportspeople from Maribor
Slovenian footballers
Association football midfielders
Slovenian expatriate footballers
A.C.R. Messina players
U.S. Salernitana 1919 players
Brescia Calcio players
NK Celje players
MKS Cracovia (football) players
Ergotelis F.C. players
Widzew Łódź players
Yokohama FC players
FK Utenis Utena players
Slovenian Second League players
Slovenian PrvaLiga players
Serie B players
Ekstraklasa players
J2 League players
A Lyga players
Slovenian expatriate sportspeople in Italy
Expatriate footballers in Italy
Slovenian expatriate sportspeople in Greece
Expatriate footballers in Greece
Slovenian expatriate sportspeople in Poland
Expatriate footballers in Poland
Slovenian expatriate sportspeople in Japan
Expatriate footballers in Japan
Slovenian expatriate sportspeople in Lithuania
Expatriate footballers in Lithuania
F.C. Rieti players